Beroe cucumis is a species of comb jelly in the family Beroidae. It is found in the Atlantic Ocean. It was first described by the Danish missionary and naturalist Otto Fabricius in 1780.

Description
The wide mouth is at one end. The body has eight longitudinal rows of cilia that extend from the aboral end (opposite end to the mouth), three quarters of the way along the animal. The cilia are arranged on short transverse plates and beat in synchrony to propel the animal through the water, giving a shimmering effect. The general body colour is pink, especially along the rows of cilia, and the plates are bioluminescent. There is a figure of eight shaped ring of small papillae around the aboral tip. Gastrovascular channels extend from the stomach through the body wall beneath the rows of cilia, and these have short side branches, which distinguishes Beroe cucumis from the otherwise similar Beroe gracilis. Juveniles of the two species are indistinguishable.

Distribution
Beroe cucumis is found in the North Atlantic Ocean and the North Sea, including the Skagerrak and the Kattegat. It sometimes occurs in the Mediterranean Sea. It is a pelagic, open water species and its depth range is not known.

Ecology
Beroe cucumis is a predator and mostly feeds on other comb jellies, particularly Bolinopsis infundibulum; these are pulled into the large mouth and swallowed whole.

The comb jelly Mnemiopsis leidyi is an invasive species originally native to the western Atlantic coastal waters that was introduced into the Black Sea in the 1980s, with deleterious results to the ecosystem. Since then it has spread to the Caspian Sea, the North Sea and the Baltic Sea. In the Black Sea, some measure of control was achieved when another predatory comb jelly, Beroe ovata, was introduced.

Mnemiopsis leidyi was first recorded in the Mediterranean Sea in 1990 and in 2009, large swarms were present in some areas. Beroe cucumis is native to the northern Atlantic Ocean and sometimes occurs in the Mediterranean Sea, and it is being monitored to see if it can provide some level of control of M. leidyi. In 2012, Beroe cucumis was found off the coast of Israel for the first time, and there is proof that it preys on M. leidyi, as an individual was found with a partially digested M. leidyi in its stomach.

References

Nuda
Fauna of the Atlantic Ocean
Fauna of the Mediterranean Sea
Animals described in 1780
Taxa named by Otto Fabricius